The following treaties of Paris were signed in 1801:

Treaty of Paris (August 1801), peace treaty between France and Bavaria
, final peace treaty between Russia and Spain
Treaty of Paris (8 October 1801), final peace treaty between France and Russia
Treaty of Paris (9 October 1801), preliminary peace treaty between France and the Ottoman Empire